The Dressmaker is a 2015 Australian revenge comedy-drama film written and directed by Jocelyn Moorhouse, based on the novel of the same name by Rosalie Ham. It stars Kate Winslet as a femme fatale in the titular role of the dressmaker, Myrtle "Tilly" Dunnage, who returns to a small Australian town to take care of her ailing, mentally unstable mother. It had a theatrical release on 29 October 2015 in Australia and New Zealand.

The film led the 5th AACTA Awards with thirteen nominations, including Best Film, Best Direction, Best Production Design, Best Original Music Score, Best Sound, Best Editing, Best Cinematography and won Best Lead Actress for Winslet, Best Supporting Actress for Judy Davis, Best Supporting Actor For Hugo Weaving, Best Costume Design for Marion Boyce and Margot Wilson, and People's Choice Award for Favourite Australian Film.

Apart from AACTA, Winslet and Davis both won awards from Australian Film Critics Association and Film Critics Circle of Australia for their performances. In addition, Davis was also nominated at AACTA International Awards for Best Supporting Actress.

In The Hollywood Reporter's annual critic picks, Davis's performance in the film was included among "the 25 Best Film Performances of 2016". It was one of the seven films shortlisted by the Academy Awards for Best Makeup and Hairstyling at the 89th ceremony.

Awards and nominations

Notes

See also
 2015 in film

References

External links
 

Lists of accolades by film